John Foster Gilding (4 July 1884 – 9 November 1969) was an  Australian rules footballer who played with St Kilda in the Victorian Football League (VFL).

After playing a single game for St Kilda in Round 4 of the 1907 season he transferred to Richmond (then in the Victorian Football Association) in the middle of the season. He did not play a senior game for Richmond and following a move to Adelaide, he played two games for North Adelaide in the South Australian Football League in 1908.

Notes

External links 

1884 births
1969 deaths
Australian rules footballers from Victoria (Australia)
St Kilda Football Club players
North Adelaide Football Club players
Benalla Football Club players